Gelechia leptospora is a moth of the family Gelechiidae. It is found in Costa Rica.

References

Moths described in 1932
Gelechia